Jean Dumont (born 14 August 1943 in Ambérieu-en-Bugey, Ain) is a French former professional road bicycle racer. His sporting career began with A.S.E.B Lyon.  Dumont won stage 5B of the 1968 Tour de France.

Major results

1963
 national amateur road race champion
GP de France
1965
Boucles Pertuisiennes
Boussac
1968
Tour de France:
Winner stage 5B
Auzances

References

External links 
Jean Dumont (cyclist) profile at the Cycling Website
Official Tour de France results for Jean Dumont

1943 births
Living people
People from Ambérieu-en-Bugey
French male cyclists
French Tour de France stage winners
Sportspeople from Ain
Cyclists from Auvergne-Rhône-Alpes